Harbin Museum of Jewish History and Culture is a museum commemorating the Jewish diaspora in Harbin, China from early 1900s to 1950s. It is located at the former site of the New Synagogue of Harbin. The museum features documents, photographs, films, and personal items documenting the lives of some of the more than 20,000 Jewish residents in Harbin.

Exhibitions
The first floor of the museum shows photographs, paintings of several buildings in Harbin constructed by Jews in the first half of the 20th century.

The exhibitions on the second and third floors present education, industry, art and music of Jews in Harbin.

Architecture
Built in 1918 as Harbin New Synagogue after Harbin General Synagogue, which is now the Harbin Old Synagogue Concert Hall, the new synagogue was the largest of its kind in China. The synagogue was closed in 1950s as Jews in Harbin were leaving and heading for destinations such as Israel, the United States and Australia.

In 2004, Harbin municipal government restored the synagogue to its original architectural style and transferred the building into the current museum.

References

Jews and Judaism in Harbin
Tourist attractions in Harbin
Museums in Heilongjiang
Buildings and structures in Harbin
Synagogues in China
Synagogues preserved as museums
Jewish Chinese history
Jewish history organizations